Gonzalo Julián Conde (born 29 August 1998), known professionally as Bizarrap, is an Argentine DJ and record producer. He specializes in EDM, Latin trap and rap. He is known for his Bzrp Music Sessions, a series of independent tracks which he records with a wide variety of artists. He was nominated for a Latin Grammy Award for Best Producer in 2021.

Early years 
Gonzalo was born on 29 August 1998 in Ramos Mejía, Argentina. He was interested in music from a young age, and had an interest in electronic music and DJs, rather than singing. His main influences were Skrillex, David Guetta, and Martin Garrix. At the age of 14 he began studying music theory, enrolled in piano classes, and began to produce his first songs.

Career 
His career started in 2017 with the "Combos Locos" that he put together with highlights from local freestyle battles. That environment led him to become friends with figures like Lit Killah, Kodigo, Ecko, with whom he began remixing in parallel. His first hit came from Duki and the BZRP version of "No Vendo Trap". From there, other artists opened their doors for him to remix their songs, including Dani, Ecko, Paulo Londra and Khea. The first Freestyle Session was released on 17 November 2018 and starred Kodigo. Little by little, other referents such as Sony and Acru joined in, and by the following February the Music Sessions arrived with Bhavi as inaugurator.

In December 2020, Bizarrap became the most listened-to Argentine artist and producer in the world with more than 11 million monthly listeners on Spotify, entering the 300 most listened to artists in the world.

Discography

References 

Living people
1998 births
Argentine record producers
Argentine DJs
Musicians from Buenos Aires
People from Ramos Mejía